Eric John Michael Hester (born January 9, 1974) is an American composer.

Early life and family
Eric Hester was born on January 9, 1974, in Las Vegas, Nevada. In 1979, he moved with his family to Newport Beach, California.  In 1988, he moved to San Clemente where he attended San Clemente High School and studied with composer and songwriter, Mike Bacich, of Oingo Boingo. In 1992, Hester moved to Los Angeles, where he attended the University of California, Los Angeles extension program.

Hester's first composing work came on Roundhouse, on Nickelodeon, which he was nominated for the CableACE Award in 1995 for the song, "Second Chance".

Album Producer
Hester was a contributing producer on the Britney Spears song "Follow Me" (also the theme to Nickelodeon's Zoey 101). He also was the string arranger on the track.

Film and television scores
The following list consists of select films and television shows for which Eric Hester wrote the score and/or songs.

1990s
Roundhouse (1992–1995)
Barnyard Buddies (1996)
Turmoil (1997)
Cheap Theatrix (1998)
Violent Times (1997)
Rained In (1998)
Sworn to Secrecy: Secrets of War (1998)
Compassion (1999)
The Pretender (1998–2000)

2000s
Voyeur.com aka BigBrother.com (UK) (2000)
The Fountain (2001)
My First Day (1991)
Nash Bridges (2000)
Mr. Chi Chi's Guide to the Universe (2000–2001)
Future Murder (2000)
Three Blind Mice aka Ed McBain's Three Blind Mice (USA: complete title) (2001)
Altered Species (2001)
Flatland (2002)
VH1 Big in 2002 Awards (2002)
Revelation (2002)
The Monkey's Paw (2003)
The Utopian Society (2003)
Knee High P.I. (additional music) (2003)
American Almanacs: A Living History (2003)
Bollywood and Vine (2004)
Pizza: The Movie (2004)
Marcus Apple (2004)
Jack (2004)
A Soft Embrace (2004)
Client 3815 (2004)
A Night at Sophie's (2004)
Rodney (2004–2006)
The Swap (2005)
20 Things to Do Before You're 30 (USA) (2005)
Ana (2005)
Zoey 101 (2005–2007)
Lost Mission (2006)
Making the Cut (2006)
Waiting (2007)
An Excellent Choice (2007)
Sympathy (2007)
Women On Top (2007)
Snowball (2007)
The Flower Girl (2008)
Peter Rabbit (2008)
Frail (in production) (2009)

Concertos
Cape Cod Recessional (2000)
A Hymn To A New Season (2001)
911: Triumphant Spirit (2003)

Discography 
 Snowball Original Motion Picture Soundtrack, 2008
 Lost Mission Original Motion Picture Soundtrack, 2007
 Zoey 101: Music Mix CD, 2007 "Follow Me" by Britney Spears Production and String Arrangement by Eric Hester
 Shorts:  Volume 1, 2006
 My First Day, 2005

External links
Official website

 Interview with Eric Hester (The Daily Film Music Blog)

References

American film score composers
Living people
1974 births